Parapsestis is a genus of moths belonging to the subfamily Thyatirinae of the Drepanidae.

Species
 Parapsestis albida Suzuki, 1916
 Parapsestis argenteopicta (Oberthür, 1879)
 Parapsestis cinerea Laszlo, G. Ronkay, L. Ronkay & Witt, 2007
 Parapsestis dabashana Laszlo, G. Ronkay, L. Ronkay & Witt, 2007
 Parapsestis hausmanni Laszlo, G. Ronkay, L. Ronkay & Witt, 2007
 Parapsestis implicata Laszlo, G. Ronkay, L. Ronkay & Witt, 2007
 Parapsestis lichenea (Hampson, 1893)
 Parapsestis meleagris Houlbert, 1921
 Parapsestis odilei Orhant, 2006
 Parapsestis pseudomaculata (Houlbert, 1921)
 Parapsestis tomponis (Matsumura, 1933)
 Parapsestis wernyaminta Laszlo, G. Ronkay, L. Ronkay & Witt, 2007

Former species
 Parapsestis baibarana 
 Parapsestis taiwana 
 Parapsestis umbrosa

References

Thyatirinae
Drepanidae genera